Rivaldo Moonsamy (born 13 September 1996) is a South African cricketer who plays for Titans. In December 2015 he was named in South Africa's squad for the 2016 Under-19 Cricket World Cup. In August 2017, he was named in Benoni Zalmi's squad for the first season of the T20 Global League. However, in October 2017, Cricket South Africa initially postponed the tournament until November 2018, with it being cancelled soon after.

On 7 January 2017, he scored his maiden century in List A cricket, batting for Titans against Warriors in the 2017–18 Momentum One Day Cup.

In June 2018, he was named in the squad for the Titans team for the 2018–19 season. In September 2018, he was named in the Titans' squad for the 2018 Abu Dhabi T20 Trophy. In April 2021, he was named in Northern Cape's squad, ahead of the 2021–22 cricket season in South Africa.

References

External links
 

1996 births
Living people
South African cricketers
Northerns cricketers
Place of birth missing (living people)